Area code 000 is not a valid number in any country where dialling '0' reaches an operator.

North America
Area code 000 is not a valid North American Numbering Plan exchange or area code.

European Union, and 0 trunk prefix
It is invalid in the European Union and many other nations where '0' is reserved as a trunk prefix and '00' as an international call prefix.

Australia
In Australia, 000 is reserved as an emergency telephone number.

Caller ID presentation
This code may show up as part of a number on a caller id system when receiving telemarketer outbound calls or from VoIP services, such as Skype or Vonage, because there is no requirement that caller id data represent a valid telephone number.

See also
 Caller ID spoofing
 000, Australian emergency telephone number

References

000